Events from the year 1583 in France

Incumbents
 Monarch – Henry III

Events
 January 18 – François, Duke of Anjou, attacks Antwerp.

Births
 Charles de La Vieuville
 Jean de Lauson

Deaths
 
 November 24 – René de Birague, French cardinal and chancellor (b. 1506)

See also

References

1580s in France